Kids Run Free is a British charity based in Warwickshire founded by Martine Verweij and Catherine O'Carroll in December 2010.

Events
Kids Run Free organize free, regular running events for children, of all ages. The children's abilities to be a part of the schools program, is as follows. Marathon Kids. The first Kids Run Free event was held in Solihull in May 2011. Other locations were launched in Leamington Spa in July 2011, Coventry in April 2012, and Birmingham in May 2012.

Patrons
Since March 2012 former Olympic athlete David Moorcroft has served as a patron for Kids Run Free. Moorcroft is actively involved with Kids Run Free events and was present at the launch of the charity's Coventry race location.

Mascot
The Kids Run Free mascot was named following a competition held by the charity in February 2012. The competition winners chose to name the mascot 'Dash'.

Partnerships
Kids Run Free works in partnership with its sister organisation Raceways. Raceways is a Multisport Event Management company committed to organising races for adults. The proceeds of Raceways events are donated to Kids Run Free.

References

External links
 Kids Run Free Official website
 Kids Run Free, Registered charity no. 1146636 at the Charity Commission
 Raceways Raceways official website

Children's charities based in the United Kingdom
Charities based in Warwickshire
Physical education